Fourteen Japanese people have participated in space flights. Of these, twelve—ten men and two women—were professional astronauts and two were space tourists. Five of the astronauts have retired, while seven (colored) are in the active unit.

Two Japanese astronauts have been in space at the same time on two occasions :
 Soichi Noguchi and Naoko Yamazaki from 5 April 2010 to 20 April 2010
 Soichi Noguchi and Akihiko Hoshide from 23 April 2021 to 2 May 2021

Future flights

References

Japanese